Air Vice Marshal Forster Herbert Martin "Sammy" Maynard,  (1 May 1893 – 26 January 1976) was a senior commander in the Royal Air Force and a flying ace credited with six aerial victories during the First World War. He also served as the Air Officer Commanding Malta during the early part of the Second World War.

His son, Nigel Maynard, also became an air marshal in the RAF.

Early life
He was born in New Zealand to a Church of England clergyman. The family returned to England two years later and he was educated at St John's School, Leatherhead, and University College London.

World War I
Maynard joined the Royal Naval Division in 1914 as an engineer. He transferred to the Royal Naval Air Service the following year. After training, he became an instructor until 1916.

In January 1917, he was posted to No. 1 Squadron RNAS on the Western Front. While there, flying a Sopwith Triplane, he ran up a string of six victories from 29 April through 1 June 1917; his final tally included an enemy fighter set afire, another one destroyed in conjunction with a couple of squadron mates, and four enemy planes driven down out of control, including one shared with Cyril Ridley and six other pilots.

In September 1917, he was transferred to the aircraft depot at Dunkirk. After his return to England, he was injured in a crash. After recovery, he became officer commanding of a training depot. He subsequently received the Air Force Cross for his work in training.

Inter war
Between the wars he attended the Imperial Defence College. He was posted to HQ Iraq Command and served administrative positions for the Air Staff.

World War II
Maynard obtained permission to assemble them, and three of these units, named "Faith", "Hope", and "Charity", they were part of the initially limited defence during the Siege of Malta.

After he was replaced on Malta, he was AOA, HQ RAF Coastal Command. In 1944 he was AOC of No. 19 (Reconnaissance) Group.

Notes

References
Forster Maynard at New Zealand Fighter Pilots Museum
Above the Trenches: a Complete Record of the Fighter Aces and Units of the British Empire Air Forces 1915–1920. Christopher F. Shores, Norman L. R. Franks, Russell Guest. Grub Street, 1990. , .

Air Vice-Marshal F H M Maynard – Air of Authority – A History of RAF Organisation

1893 births
1976 deaths
Graduates of the Royal College of Defence Studies
Companions of the Order of the Bath
Foreign recipients of the Legion of Merit
New Zealand people of World War II
New Zealand World War I flying aces
People from Waiuku
New Zealand recipients of the Air Force Cross (United Kingdom)
Royal Military College of Canada alumni
Royal Naval Air Service personnel of World War I
Royal Air Force air marshals of World War II
People educated at St John's School, Leatherhead
Alumni of University College London